An election to Leitrim County Council took place on 31 May 1920 as part of that year's Irish local elections. 19 councillors were elected from 5 electoral divisions by PR-STV voting for a five-year term of office.

Sinn Féin won every seat for election. The large majority of seats were uncontested, although in Manorhamilton, where seats were contested, Sinn Féin won a massive majority of the votes and as such still secured every seat.

Results by party

Results by Electoral Area

Ballinamore

Carrick-on-Shannon

Carrigallen

Dromahair

Manorhamilton

References

1920 Irish local elections
1920